Mordechai Ofer (born 20 February 1924, died 1 September 1971) was an Israeli politician who served as a member of the Knesset for the Alignment and Labor Party from 1965 until his death in 1971.

Biography
Born in Kraków in Poland in 1924, Ofer made aliyah to Mandatory Palestine the following year. He joined the Mandate-era Jewish Police force, and served in the IDF during the 1948 Arab-Israeli War.

After being demobilised in 1950 with the rank of Lieutenant Colonel, he began working for Egged. He became a member of the co-operative's board, and from 1961 until his death, served as director of its Finances department.

In 1965 he was elected to the Knesset on the Alignment list. He was re-elected in 1969, but died in office in September 1971 at the age of 47. His seat was taken by Moshe Shahal.

References

External links

1924 births
1971 deaths
Polish emigrants to Mandatory Palestine
Jews in Mandatory Palestine
Israeli soldiers
Alignment (Israel) politicians
Israeli Labor Party politicians
Members of the 6th Knesset (1965–1969)
Members of the 7th Knesset (1969–1974)